Pseudobithynia pentheri is a species of freshwater snail with a gill and an operculum, an aquatic gastropod mollusk in the family Bithyniidae.

The specific name pentheri is in honor of malacologist Arnold Penther, who collected this species.

Glöer & Yildrim (2006) moved this species from the genus Bythinia to the genus Pseudobithynia in 2006.

Distribution 
This species is endemic to Turkey.

The type locality is "Vilayet Kayseri. Soisaly 1075 m ü.M".

References

External links 
 Sturany R. (1905). "Schalentragende Mollusken". In: Penther A. & Zederbauer E. "Ergebnisse einer naturwissenschaftlichen Reise zum Erdschias-Dagh (Kleinasien)". Annalen des kaiserlich-königlichen Naturhistorischen Hofmuseums in Wien 20(2/3): 295–307. Page 306, fig. 10.

Bithyniidae
Gastropods described in 1904
Endemic fauna of Turkey